Nateete is a location in the city of Kampala, Uganda's capital.

Location
Nateete is located in Lubaga Division, on the southwestern edge of the city of Kampala. It is bordered by Busega to the north, Lungujja to the northeast, Lubaga to the northeast, Ndeeba to the southeast, Mutundwe to the south and Buloba to the west.

Overview
Nateete lies on the main highway (A-109), between Kampala and Masaka. There is a major intersection in Nateete, where the highway to Mityana, Mubende, Fort Portal and on to the Democratic Republic of the Congo splits off the highway to Masaka, Mbarara, Kabale and on to Kigali in Rwanda. At the same location, the Kampala Northern Bypass, a double carriageway highway bypassing downtown Kampala, re-joins the highways to the Rwanda and the Congo, having split off the Kampala-Jinja Highway at Namboole, in Kira.

Today, Nateete is a busy, growing metropolitan area with businesses, small industries, retail shops and a thriving farmers market. Many of Uganda's banking institutions maintain branches in the area due to the booming business in commercial and retail banking in the neighborhood. Uchumi, a leading supermarket chain in East Africa, maintains a branch in the neighborhood.

See also

References

External links
 Interdicted Nateete OC redeployed

Neighborhoods of Kampala
Lubaga Division